The Nishan Sahib (Gurmukhi: ਨਿਸ਼ਾਨ ਸਾਹਿਬ niśāna sāhiba) is a Sikh triangular flag made of cotton or silk cloth, with a tassel at its end. The word, Nishan Sahib means exalted ensign, and the flag is hoisted on a tall flagpole, outside most Gurdwaras. The flagpole itself, covered with fabric, ends with a Khanda on top (In the past an Astbuj, nagani barsha or a teer would be placed on top). The emblem on the flag is known as Khanda, which depicts a double-edged sword called a khanda (Miri te Piri) (☬) in the centre, a chakkar which is circular, and flanked by two single-edged swords, or kirpans. Almost all Sikh warriors used to wear it in the eighteenth century, and Nihangs of today still do. The Khanda Sahib is not to be confused with the Nihang's Aad Chand which was the first symbol of the Khalsa. The Khanda was not introduced by Guru Hargobind Sahib Ji but it was a plain yellow banner.

The Nishan Sahib dates back to 1606, when Sixth Guru Har Gobind raised the first Sikh flag over the Akal Takhat seat of authority in Amritsar, India. At that time, Sikhs called the flag Akal Dhuja (undying banner), or Satguru Nishan (true guru's insignia).

Traditional symbol of the Khalsa Panth (corps of initiated Sikhs), the Nishan Sahib can be seen from far away, signifying the presence of Khalsa in the neighbourhood. It is taken down every Baisakhi (harvest festival, mid-April in the Gregorian calendar and in Vaisakh month in the Nanakshahi calendar), and replaced with a fresh flag, and the flagpole refurbished.

History 

During the time of Guru Hargobind, the Nishan Sahib was made into a shade of yellow, known as Basanti, to show the spirituality of the Sikhs and their warrior spirit. After the creation of Khalsa, Guru Gobind Singh introduced Navy Blue (called Surmayee) flag, which is still the colour of the Nihang flags. The first Sikh flags were plain, but emblems were introduced by Guru Gobind Singh. The first Sikh emblem, was not the Khanda, but the three weapons, the Kattar (dagger), Dhal (shield) and Kirpan (sabre). Later these emblems were also used by the Sikh misls and the Empire.

When Gulab Singh asked Maharaja Ranjit Singh to change the Nishan Sahib to saffron or deep orange Maharaja Ranjit Singh declined but later when he changed the army from traditional Akalis to French-style soldiers he made separate flags to respect Hindu and Muslim ideologies. Later the Battle standards for Muslim regiments was the Lion and the Sun and the Hindu Regiments were various gods and goddesses.

Later during the British Rule it became from Basanti and Surmayee to Kesari. 

During the Singh Sabha Movement the Sikhs tried to restore Sikhism to its pristine glory so in the start it became the Flag of the Dal Khalsa but slowly it changed to the today's Nishan Sahib with the Khanda Emblem.

Weapons and ornaments 
The original Nishan Sahib carried by Guru Gobind Singh ji in the Kattar, Dhal, Kirpan format had either a Ashtabhuja Duja, Nangini Barcha or Karpa Barcha used as a spear on top. The Nagni Barcha or snake like sword was created by Guru Gobind Singh ji and famously used by Bhai Bachittar Singh to pierce the trunk of a drunken, armored elephant in the Battle of Nimolgarh. The Ashtabhuja is a spear with three crescents stuck to an iron rod with two spears coming out on top. The Ashtabhuja was mainly used as the Battle Stadered of the Tenth Guru and is highly recommended. Guru Gobind Singh Ji's ashtabhuja was found in Chamkaur sahib the place where his two sons were martyred and other two captured with his mother. The flag is simply wrapped around the top of the spear with two strings of fabric coming out of the tip.

While today's Nishan Sahib has a Khanda in a dagger form on top of the flag and the fabric covering the spear till the top. The Khanda symbol is also relatively new and was made in the early 19th century.

Overview
The Nishan Sahib is placed outside Sikh Gurdwaras and is supported by a pole.

The Khanda, a Sikh symbol, today, is rendered in navy blue on the saffron background while the original was basanti (bright yellow) and surrmai neela (Royal blue).  The khanda is placed high up on a flagpole as a sign for all Sikhs and indeed any other people that they can come and pray in this building. Great respect is shown to this flag and the flag is considered sacred and washed using milk and water every year in April at the festival of Vaisakhi. The Nishan Sahib is changed once the saffron color has faded.

The Sikh Rehat Maryada clearly states that the Nishan Sahib hoisted outside every Gurudwara should be xanthic (Basanti in Punjabi) or greyish blue (modern day Navy blue) (Surmaaee in Punjabi) color.

Gallery

References

External links
 SikhMuseum.com Nishan Sahib Exhibit

Gurdwaras
Sikh terminology
Religious flags
Flags of India